Racism in Sudan is a complex matter due to the racial mixture of various populations. Sudanese Arabs are among the 600 ethnic groups who live there, and there are elements within Arab Sudanese society that view black people and blackness with disfavor. Sudan is dominated by a light-skinned, Arabic-speaking elite, while black Africans often face oppression and marginalization. Sudan has been in the Arab League since 1956. Skin whitening is relatively common among some Sudanese.  The preference for light skin in Sudanese society is rooted in the legacies of slavery and colonialism. Skin color is not the sole determining factor in distinction between Sudanese Arabs and Sudanese Africans. The extent that a person has Arab ancestry, speaking the Arabic language, and practicing Islam can be associated with being "Arab" and "non-black" and can determine social status. Sudanese conceptions of race differ from conceptions of race in the Western world. Many dark-skinned Sudanese, such as former president Omar al-Bashir, would be considered "black" in a country such as the United States but are considered "non-black" within Sudan.

According to a CBS news article published in 1999, slaves have been sold for US$50 apiece. In September, 2000, the U.S. State Department alleged that "the Sudanese government's support of slavery and its continued military action which has resulted in numerous deaths are due in part to the victims' religious beliefs." Jok Madut Jok, professor of History at Loyola Marymount University, states that the abduction of women and children of the south by north is slavery by any definition. The government of Sudan insists that the whole matter is no more than the traditional tribal feuding over resources.

During the Second Sudanese Civil War people were taken into slavery; estimates of abductions range from 14,000 to 200,000. Abduction of Dinka women and children was common.

The Darfur conflict has been described by some as a racial matter. Unlike the Southern Sudanese the Fur people are primarily Muslims so the conflict has been argued to be more ethnic rather than religious, although debates about water and land usage were also a factor.

Beginning in 1991 elders of the Zaghawa people of Sudan complained that they were victims of an intensifying Arab apartheid campaign. Vukoni Lupa Lasaga has accused the Sudanese government of "deftly manipulat(ing) Arab solidarity" to carry out policies of apartheid and ethnic cleansing against non-Arabs in Darfur. Alan Dershowitz has pointed to the extremely prevalent elite-sponsored colorism in Sudan as an example of a government that deserves the appellation "apartheid," and former Canadian Minister of Justice Irwin Cotler has also criticized Sudan in similar terms.

Footnotes

See also
Arab slave trade
Slavery in Sudan
The Black Book: Imbalance of Power and Wealth in the Sudan

Anti-black racism in Africa
Sudan
Sudan
Sudan
Society of Sudan
Social issues in Sudan